Tenellia pinnifera is a species of sea slug, an aeolid nudibranch, a marine gastropod mollusc in the family Fionidae.

Distribution
This species was described from Sagami Bay, Japan. It was subsequently reported from Kii Peninsula, Osaka Bay, Toyama Bay and Tsuruga Bay.

Description
This Tenellia is a white animal with a single, broken, band of orange-yellow below the tip of the cerata.

References 

Fionidae
Gastropods described in 1949